Physiology, Physiological Chemistry, Pharmacology, with the parallel German title Berichte Physiologie, physiologische Chemie und Pharmakologie, was a German medical journal with a focus on physiology, physiological chemistry and pharmacology, published by Springer. It was established by Carl Oppenheimer, Paul Ehrlich, Emil Fischer, Albrecht Kossel, Ernst Leopold Salkowski and Nathan Zuntz in 1902, originally titled Biochemisches Zentralblatt and later retitled Zentralblatt für Biochemie und Biophysik. It was retitled Berichte über die gesamte Physiologie und experimentelle Pharmakologie in 1920, which is sometimes known as Rona's Berichte,  and received its final title in 1969. It ceased publication in 1980.

References

Springer Science+Business Media academic journals
Pharmacology journals
Physiology journals
Publications established in 1902